Griffith railway station is located on the Yanco-Griffith line in New South Wales, Australia. It serves the city of Griffith.

History
Griffith station opened on 3 July 1916 when the Temora-Roto line was extended from Barellan. It served as the terminus until the line was extended to Hillston on 18 June 1923. In 1928, it became a junction station when the  Yanco-Griffith line opened from Yanco.

Services
Griffith is the terminus for a twice weekly NSW TrainLink Xplorer from Sydney split from Canberrra services at Goulburn. NSW TrainLink also operate a road coach service from Wagga Wagga to Griffith, while a Cootamundra to Mildura service also operates via Griffith.

References

Easy Access railway stations in New South Wales
Griffith, New South Wales
Railway stations in Australia opened in 1916
Regional railway stations in New South Wales